Zebilla is a  town and is the capital of Bawku West district, a district in the Upper East Region of north Ghana. Zebilla is renowned for its abundance of guinea fowl.

References

See also
Binaba – 15 km south of Zebilla

Populated places in the Upper East Region